Beatrice M. L. de Gelder (born 1944) is a cognitive neuroscientist and neuropsychologist. She joined the Department of Cognitive Neuroscince at Maastricht University in 2012. Her research interests include  behavioral and neural emotion processing from facial and bodily expressions, multisensory perception and interaction between auditory and visual processes, and nonconscious perception in neurological patients. She is author of  books and publications. She was a Fellow of the Netherlands Institute for Advanced Study, and an elected member of the International Neuropsychological Symposia since 1999. She is currently the editor-in-chief of the journal Frontiers in Emotion Science and  associate editor for Frontiers in Perception Science.

Education 
De Gelder holds degrees in both Philosophy (1967) and Psychology (1969), and received her PhD in philosophy 1972 from the University of Leuven, Belgium. She began her academic career teaching Philosophy of Science, first in Leiden (1973–79) and then in Tilburg (1980–92). In the mid nineties de Gelder began her work in the field of Cognitive and Affective Neuroscience.

Areas of research 
De Gelder has innovated in a number of research areas and has contributed significantly to new developments. 
 Face recognition: De Gelder has shown that brain damage in one area does not simply lead to loss of a specific function but that intact brain areas can actively interfere with normal function (inverted faces are better recognized than upright ones). This resulted in a new model of face recognition. For this research and as a service to the community she recruited persons with face recognition difficulties through a website.  
 Multisensory perception of emotion integrating facial expressions speech prosody: This work was the first to investigate the perceptual combination of facial expression with emotional voice signals and measure EEG. Her team published evidence for emotional face/voice integration in autism and in schizophrenia. 
 Nonconscious emotion perception in hemianopia patients (affective blindsight): De Gelder discovered that without V1 cortex, there is still recognition of facial expressions albeit unconsciously, an entirely novel finding that has since then been replicated in different labs.
 Emotional body expressions: In 2003 de Gelder published the first neuroscientific study on emotional body perception. Her team was the first to combine methods of psychology and neuropsychology with novel neuroscience tools – like EEG and fMRI – in research on bodily expressions and have put this topic on the agenda for a new generation of affective scientists. 
 Scene context:  De Gelder initiated a new research line on the study on emotional scene gist and its effect on face recognition.  This opened new perspectives for investigating emotion deficits in schizophrenia and autism. 
 Social interaction: De Gelder  explored social interaction using realistic stimuli and recently published the first fMRI study using realistic interaction videos of interpersonal threat situations.

Selected publications 
 Gelder, B. de, Haan, E.H.F. de, & Heywood, C. (Eds.) (2001). Out of mind: varieties of unconscious processes. Oxford: Oxford University Press.
 Gelder, B. de, & Morais, J. (Eds.) (1995). Speech and reading: a comparative approach. Oxford: Taylor and Francis.
 Gelder, B. de (Ed) (1982) Knowledge and Representation. Routledge & Kegan Paul (International Library of Psychology), 218p.
 ''Emotions and the body', to be published in early 2016, Oxford University Press, New York.

References

External links
 Personal webpage with publications

1944 births
Living people
Cognitive neuroscientists
Dutch women neuroscientists
Dutch neuroscientists
Neuropsychologists
Dutch psychologists
Dutch women psychologists
Philosophy academics
Emotion psychologists
People from East Flanders
Catholic University of Leuven alumni
Academic staff of Tilburg University
Academic staff of Maastricht University
20th-century Belgian philosophers
Belgian women philosophers